The Rival Modes is a 1727 comedy play by the British writer James Moore Smythe.

The original Drury Lane cast included Colley Cibber as the Earl of Late Airs, Theophilus Cibber as Lord Toupet, John Harper as Sir Oliver Bruin, Robert Wilks as Ballamine, John Mills as Sagely, Henry Norris as Henry, Joe Miller as George, Anne Oldfield as Amoret, Mary Porter as Melissa and Christiana Horton as Clary.

References

Bibliography
 Burling, William J. A Checklist of New Plays and Entertainments on the London Stage, 1700-1737. Fairleigh Dickinson Univ Press, 1992.
 Nicoll, Allardyce. History of English Drama, 1660-1900, Volume 2. Cambridge University Press, 2009.

1727 plays
British plays
West End plays
Comedy plays